Suklabaidya is an Indian surname. Notable people with this surname include:

Lalit Mohan Suklabaidya (born 1942), Indian politician
Parimal Suklabaidya (born 1958), Indian politician

Surnames of Indian origin